This is a list of African spirits as well as deities found within the traditional African religions. It also covers spirits as well as deities found within the Afro-American religions—which is mostly derived from traditional African religions. Additionally, prominent mythic figures including heroes and legendary creatures may also be included in this list.

Akan
Abu-Mehsu
Amokye
Anansi
Asase Ya
Aso
Bia
Bobowissi
Bosomtwe
Intikuma
Katarwiri
Kwase Benefo
Kweku Tsin
Nyame
Owuo
Tano

Alur 

 Jok Odudu

Bambara
Bemba
Chiwara
Duga
Faro
Kontron
Muso Koroni
Ndomadyiri
Ninimini
Sanen
Suruku
Teliko

Baganda 

 Katonda
Ggulu
Kibuka
Kitaka
Kiwanuka
Mukasa
Musisi
Nambi
Warumbe
Wanema
Wanga

Bahumono
Owazi

Boloki 

 Libanza
 Njambe

Dahomey

Agé
Ayaba
Da
Gbadu
Gleti
Gu
Lisa
Loko
Mawu
Nana Buluku
Salosteles
Sakpata
Xevioso
Zinsi
Zinsu

Dinka 

 Abuk
Aiwel
 Deng
 Kejok
 Nhialic

Efik
Abassi
Atai

Fang 

 Mebege
 Nzame

Fulani 
Baa-Wamnde
Bâgoumâwel
Bocoonde
Buytoorin
Celi
Dandi
Dumunna
Foroforondu 
Ga
Gorko-mawɗo
Guéno
Haɓɓana-koel
Hammadi
Kaidara
Kiikala
Koumbasara
Koumen
Lewru
Naagara
Naange
Ndurbeele
Neɗɗo
Neɗɗo-mawɗo
Njeddo Dewal
Nounfayiri
Rongo
Silé Sadio
Sitti
Tongo
Tooke
Tyanaba

Gikuyu
Ngai

Hausa 

 Bayajida
 Gizo

Igbo

Aha Njoku
Ala
Amadioha
Agwu
Anyanwu
Ekwensu
Ikenga
Nmuo Mmiri or Nne Mmiri.
Ogbunabali

Ijo 

 Ozidi
 Woyengi

Kissi

Kuino

Khoikhoi 

 Gaunab
Heitsi-eibib
 Tsui'goab

Kongo

Bunzi
Chicamassichinuinji
Dinganga
Funza
Funzi
Kalunga
Kimbazi
Kuitikuiti
Lubangala
Lusiemo
Lusunzi
Makanga
Ma Kiela
Ma Kiela
Mamba Muntu
Mbantilanda
Mbenza
Mboze
Mbumba
Moni-Mambu 
Mpulu Bunzi
Ngonda
Ntangu
Na Ngutu 
God of river Nzadi
Nzambici
Nzambi a Mpungu
Nzazi
Nzumbi
Simbi dia Maza

Krachi 

 Owuo
 Wulbari

Lotuko
Ajok

Lugbara
Adroa
Adroanzi

Maasai 

 Neiterkob
 Ngai

Mbundu
Daughter of Sun and Moon
Daughters of Kalunga-Ngombé
Goddess of Moon
God of Sun
Kabundungulu
Kalunga-Ngombé
Kimanaueze
Kishi
kianda
Musisi
Sudika-Mbambi

Nuer 

 Kwoth

Nyanga

Kahindo
Kasiyembe
Katee
Kentse
Kiruka
Kitundukutu
Kubikubi 
Mbura
Mitandi
Mpaca
Mukiti
Muisa
Musoka
Mweri
Mwindo
Nkuba
Ntumba
Nyamurairi
Ongo
Yana

Lunda
Zombi

Oromo
Waaq

Pygmy
Arebati
Khonvoum

Sawar
Jengu

Serer
Roog
Koox
Kopé Tiatie Cac
Kokh Kox
Takhar

Shona
Mwari
Nyadenga
Nyami Nyami

Somali
Waaq

Songhai
Dongo
Faran Baru Koda
Faran Maka Bote
Fono
Harakoy Dikko
Irikoy
Kyirey
Manda Hausakoy
Moussa Gname
Moussa Nyawri
Nana Miriam
N'Debbi
Nyaberi
Zaberi

Sotho 

 Ditaolane
 Modimo

Tumbuka
Chiuta

Yoruba

Aganju
Aja
Babalu Aye
Eshu
Erinle
Elegua
Ibeji
Nana
Oba
Obatala
Ogun
Oko
Olokun
Osanyin
Oshun
Oshosi
Oshumare
Ori
Orunmila
Oya
Shango
Yemoja
Osun

Venda 

 Huveane
 Tharu

Xhosa 

 Qamata

Zulu 

 Hlakanyana
Inkosazana
 Mbaba Mwana Waresa
 Unkulunkulu
 Umvelinqangi
Uncama

See also 
Alusi
List of Egyptian deities
Loa
Nkisi
Orisha
West African Mythology
Winti
Zangbeto

References

Mythological figures
Mythological figures
Lists of deities
Mythological figures
Mythological figures